Sarah Suco (born in April 1981) is a French actress.

Filmography

Sarah is also a director. She's released The Dazzled (Les Éblouis in its original language) in 2019.

References

External links

 

French film actresses
1981 births
Living people
21st-century French actresses
Actors from Montpellier
French television actresses